El Rodeo may refer to:
El Rodeo, Escuintla, Guatemala
El Rodeo, San Marcos, Guatemala
El Rodeo de San Antonio, Michoácan, Mexico  
El Rodeo (Mexico City Metrobús), a BRT station in Mexico City

See also
Rodeo (disambiguation)